The Fraudulent Advertising Act of 1916 forbade businesses and advertisers to make deliberately misleading and fraudulent statements about the goods they were selling within the District of Columbia.

1916 in American law
District of Columbia law
Advertising regulation
Regulation in the United States